Grand Old Country was a Canadian television variety series airing on CTV from 1975 to 1981. The show was hosted by country music singer Ronnie Prophet.

The show featured a variety of Canadian country music performers with a mix of others.

The show aired successfully for five seasons before it was retitled The Ronnie Prophet Show. It aired for one more season under that name.

External links
 
 TVArchive

CTV Television Network original programming
1970s Canadian variety television series
1975 Canadian television series debuts
1981 Canadian television series endings
1980s Canadian variety television series
1970s Canadian music television series
1980s Canadian music television series